Kevin Robert Kennerley (born 26 April 1954) is an English former footballer who played as a midfielder. An FA Youth Cup winner with Arsenal, he played professional football for Burnley, Port Vale and Swansea City of Wales. Kennerly in his footballing career also joined Stafford Rangers, Nantwich Town and that of Droylsden as well.

Career
Kennerley played in the Arsenal youth team, helping them to lift the FA Youth Cup in 1971 with a 2–0 aggregate victory in their two cup final legs  over Cardiff City. He however never played at the first team level for the Gunners, and thus swapped Highbury for Turf Moor when he joined Burnley in 1975. He played six First Division games for Jimmy Adamson's "Clarets" in the 1975–76 season, scoring one goal.

He then joined Roy Sproson's Port Vale in May 1976. He also found the net in a 4–2 win over Grimsby Town at Blundell Park on 3 January. In all he made 23 appearances within the Third Division, scoring once in the 1976–77 season, More action came for him in cup competitions, as he scored again against Hull City in a 3–1 win at Vale Park in the third round of the FA Cup. However, he featured just once in the 1977–78 season, and so was loaned to John Toshack's Swansea City in February 1978. He in all played two Fourth Division games at Vetch Field. As such, Kennerly made the move from the Swans in May 1978 on a free transfer to Stafford Rangers of the Northern Premier League. He later played for clubs Nantwich Town and Droylsden.

Career statistics
Source:

Honours
Arsenal
FA Youth Cup: 1971

References

1954 births
Living people
Sportspeople from Chester
English footballers
Association football midfielders
Arsenal F.C. players
Burnley F.C. players
Port Vale F.C. players
Swansea City A.F.C. players
Stafford Rangers F.C. players
Nantwich Town F.C. players
Droylsden F.C. players
English Football League players
Northern Premier League players